Russell H. Jackman (born c. 1929) was a Canadian curler. He was the lead of the 1953 Brier Champion team (skipped by Ab Gowanlock), representing Manitoba. A member of the Dauphin, Manitoba Elks of Canada branch He served as "Grand Exalted Ruler" of the organization from 1974 to 1975.

He was inducted into the Manitoba Sports Hall of Fame in 2019.

References

Brier champions
Curlers from Manitoba
Sportspeople from Dauphin, Manitoba
Canadian male curlers
1920s births
Living people
Year of birth uncertain